SD may refer to:

Organisations
 Sicherheitsdienst (Security Service), the intelligence service of the Nazi SS
 Sinistra Democratica (Democratic Left), an Italian political party
 Sisters of the Destitute, a Syro-Malabar Catholic women's order
 Social Democrats (Slovenia), a left-wing Slovenian political party
 Solidariedade, a Brazilian political party
 Democratic Party (Poland), a defunct Polish party
 Sudan Airways (IATA airline designator: SD)
 Sweden Democrats, a right wing party in Sweden
 Serbian Right (Srpska desnica), a political party in Serbia

Places
 San Diego, California
 Shandong, a province of China (Guobiao abbreviation: SD)
 South Dakota (US postal abbreviation)
 Sudan (ISO country code SD)
 Eswatini (formerly Swaziland), vehicle registration code SD

Science and technology
 Service design, the holistic design of end-to-end service experiences
 Spasmodic dysphonia, a voice disorder
 Stable disease, a possible outcome of chemotherapy according to the RECIST classification
 Spiral Dynamics, a model of individual and societal development
 Storm Data, US NOAA publication
 Subdwarf star
 Surface detector, of cosmic rays at the Pierre Auger Observatory 
 System dynamics, understanding nonlinear systems

Electronics and computing
 SD card (Secure Digital), a flash memory card format
 Software Distributor, an HP-UX system
 Standard-definition television
 Super Density Disc, an optical disc format

Mathematics
 sd (elliptic function), one of Jacobi's elliptic functions
 Standard deviation, a mathematical statistical measure

Other uses
 Sekolah Dasar, term for primary school in Indonesia
 Super D (cycling), a class of mountain bike race
 Super deformed, an art style
 Sindhi language (ISO 639-1 code: sd)
 Southern Cross Decoration (SD), a South African military award
 sine die, Latin, undated (literally without a day)
 Smith & Wesson SD, a pistol
 SD radar. an early form of radar installed on US Navy submarines in World War II to provide warning of enemy aircraft

See also
 SD1 (disambiguation)